Boratwada is a village located in Harij taluka of Patan district in Northern Gujarat, India.

References 

Villages in Patan district